Blues and Other Shades of Green is an album by trombonist Urbie Green which was recorded in 1955 and released on the ABC-Paramount label.

Reception

Jason Ankeny of AllMusic states: "Blues and Other Shades of Green casts Urbie Green in a rare small-group setting, assembling a stellar quintet ... for a crisp, coolly efficient session that leaves just enough wiggle room to allow all of the individual contributors their moment in the spotlight. Green wields both the slide and the valve trombone here, and the simplicity of the arrangements affords his lovely, direct tone the perfect platform to shine".

Track listing
All compositions by Urbie Green, except where noted.
 "Reminiscent Blues" – 3:17
 "Thou Swell" (Richard Rodgers, Lorenz Hart) – 3:20
 "You Are Too Beautiful" (Rodger, Hart) – 4:21
 "Paradise" (Nacio Herb Brown, Gordon Clifford) – 3:01
 "Warm Valley" (Duke Ellington) – 2:47
 "Frankie and Johnny" (Traditional) – 1:49
 "One for Dee" – 2:45
 "Limehouse Blues" (Philip Braham, Douglas Furber) – 2:02
 "Am I Blue?" (Harry Akst, Grant Clarke) – 3:03
 "Dirty Dan" – 2:45
 "It's Too Late Now" (Alan Jay Lerner, Burton Lane) – 3:11

Personnel
Urbie Green – trombone, valve trombone
Jimmy Raney – guitar
Dave McKenna – piano
Percy Heath – bass
Kenny Clarke – drums

References

Urbie Green albums
1955 albums
ABC Records albums
Albums recorded at Van Gelder Studio
Albums produced by Creed Taylor